Morris Goodman may refer to:
 Morris Goodman (scientist) (1925–2010), American scientist in molecular evolution and molecular systematics
 Morris E. Goodman (born 1945), American motivational speaker and author
 Morris L. Goodman, Los Angeles city councilmember